When I Was the Most Beautiful is a 2020 South Korean television series starring Im Soo-hyang, Ji Soo, Ha Seok-jin and Hwang Seung-eon. The series tells the story of a woman ceramic artist who falls in love with two brothers. Produced by May Queen Pictures and RaemongRaein Co. Ltd. for MBC, it aired on MBC TV on Wednesdays and Thursdays at 21:30 (KST) time slot from August 19 to October 15, 2020.

Synopsis
The drama tells the story Oh Ye-ji (Im Soo-hyang), an art student who dreams of becoming a ceramic artist. She heads to school in Yangpyeong as both a student and a teacher, where she meets brothers Seo Hwan (Ji Soo) and Seo Jin (Ha Seok-jin). Hwan, who is Ye-ji's student, falls in love with her and takes her to his father's workshop to confess his feelings. However, at the workshop, Ye-ji meets Jin. Although Jin is aware of Hwan's feelings toward Ye-ji, he does not hesitate to win over her heart and eventually gets engaged to her. Overnight, those who are meant to be each other's strongest supporters end up becoming the worst enemies thanks to a twist of fate. Straddling desire and love, the three struggle to figure out what's right during the most beautiful time of their lives.

Cast

Main
 Im Soo-hyang as Oh Ye-ji
  Kim Do-Hye as young Oh Ye-ji
 Oh Ye-ji is a ceramic artist. She has a pure heart and relentless optimism and refuses to give up no matter the situation. She dreams of finding ordinary happiness but in a cruel twist of fate gets caught a love triangle with two brothers, Seo Hwan and Seo Jin.

Ji Soo as Seo Hwan
  Son Yi-hyun as young Seo Hwan
 Seo Hwan, an architectural designer, is an innocent young man who falls in love with Ye-ji at first sight. His feelings put him at odds with his older brother Seo Jin, but he can’t let go his fateful first love.

Ha Seok-jin as Seo Jin
  Park Min-Sang as teenage Seo Jin
 Seo Jin is a race car driver and the leader of his rally team. He is cool and reserved on the outside but ruthless in the pursuit in what he desires. When he meet Oh Ye-ji for the first time at his father’s workshop, he instinctually feels attracted to her.

Hwang Seung-eon as Carrie Jung
 Carrie Jung is a sponsor manager at Koryo Monster and ex-girlfriend of Jin. She is charismatic, and she is intensely jealous of her ex-lover and has a selfish egotistic streaks. She is still passionately in love with Seo Jin, and is unable to let him go even after their break up.

Supporting

People around Seo Hwan
 Park Ji-young as Kim Yeon-da, Hwan's mother
 Choi Jong-hwan as Seo Sung-gon, Hwan's father
 Jeon Yu-lim as Jung Da-woon, Seo Hwan's classmate
 Son Bo-seung as Baek Jung-il, Seo Hwan's classmate
 Joo In-young as Hong Il-hwa, Da Woon's mother
 Lee Seung-il as Song In-ho, Seo Hwan's classmate
 Stephanie Lee as Amber, Seo Hwan's College Classmate

People around Oh Ye-ji
 Kim Mi-kyung as Kim Go-woon, Ye-ji's mother
 Kim Jung-tae as Ye-ji's father
 Shin Yi as Oh Ji-young, Ye-ji's aunt
 Jung Eun-pyo as Lee Kyeong-sik, Ye-ji's uncle
 Kim No-jin as Lee Chan-hee, Ye-ji's cousin
 Lee Dong-ha as Ryu Sueng-min, Ye-ji's ex-boyfriend

People around Seo Jin
 Park Ji-young as Kim Yeon-da, Jin's mother
 Choi Jong-hwan as Seo Sung-gon, Jin's father
 Lee Jae-yong as President Bang
 Kim Tae-gyeom as Kang Ki-seok, Jin's racing team
 Jung Wook-jin as Park Woo-geun, Jin's racing team

Others
 Kwon Hyuk as Kim Yeon-cheol
 Jung Wook-jin as Park Woo-geun
 Seo Eun-woo as Yoon Ji-Yang (Ep. 1–3)
 Daniel Joey Albright as Sam (Ep. 1–3)
 Lee Seung-il as Song In-ho
 Shin Dam-soo as Song In-ho's father
 Hwang Hyo-eun as Song In-ho's mother

Production
 The first script reading of the cast was held in April 2020 at MBC Ilsan Dream Centre in Gyeonggi Province, South Korea.

Original soundtrack

Part 1

Part 2

Part 3

Part 4

Part 5

Part 6

Part 7

Ratings
In this table,  represent the lowest ratings and  represent the highest ratings.

Notes

References

External links
  
 
 

MBC TV television dramas
Korean-language television shows
2020 South Korean television series debuts
2020 South Korean television series endings
South Korean romance television series
Television series by RaemongRaein